Alen Melunović (born 26 January 1990) is a Serbian professional footballer who plays as a forward for Greek Super League 2 club Iraklis.

Career
Melunović began his professional career at the Czech Gambrinus liga side FK Teplice. He made his first team debut for Teplice as a second-half substitute against Dynamo České Budějovice on 30 May 2009.

On 7 August 2021, he joined Samsunspor in Turkey.

References

External links
 
 Eurofotbal profile

1990 births
People from Prijepolje
Living people
Serbian footballers
Bosniaks of Serbia
FK Teplice players
FK Ústí nad Labem players
FK Varnsdorf players
FK Sarajevo players
Widzew Łódź players
FK Železiarne Podbrezová players
Cangzhou Mighty Lions F.C. players
Guangdong South China Tiger F.C. players
FK Napredak Kruševac players
FK Rudar Pljevlja players
FK Budućnost Podgorica players
Samsunspor footballers
Iraklis Thessaloniki F.C. players
Ekstraklasa players
China League One players
Czech First League players
Czech National Football League players
Premier League of Bosnia and Herzegovina players
Slovak Super Liga players
Montenegrin First League players
TFF First League players
Super League Greece 2 players
Serbian expatriate footballers
Expatriate footballers in the Czech Republic
Serbian expatriate sportspeople in the Czech Republic
Expatriate footballers in Bosnia and Herzegovina
Serbian expatriate sportspeople in Bosnia and Herzegovina
Expatriate footballers in Poland
Serbian expatriate sportspeople in Poland
Expatriate footballers in Slovakia
Serbian expatriate sportspeople in Slovakia
Expatriate footballers in the Netherlands
Serbian expatriate sportspeople in the Netherlands
Expatriate footballers in Montenegro
Serbian expatriate sportspeople in Montenegro
Expatriate footballers in China
Serbian expatriate sportspeople in China
Expatriate footballers in Turkey
Serbian expatriate sportspeople in Turkey
Expatriate footballers in Greece
Serbian expatriate sportspeople in Greece
Association football forwards